Edinburgh Theological Seminary, formerly known as the Free Church College, is a theological seminary in Edinburgh connected to the Free Church of Scotland. It traces its origins back to the foundation of New College, Edinburgh at the time of the Disruption of 1843. At the formation of the United Free Church, the United Free Church was granted the New College buildings, and so the continuing Free Church moved to new premises in 1907. It acquired its present name in 2014.

Edinburgh Theological Seminary offers Bachelor of Theology and a variety of Master of Theology degree programmes, which are validated by the University of Glasgow.

Notable faculty
William Menzies Alexander
G. N. M. Collins
Allan Harman
Donald Maclean
Donald Macleod
J. Douglas MacMillan

Notable alumni
Iain D. Campbell
Jack Glass
Richard McIlwaine
Maurice Roberts

References

External links
Official website

Educational institutions established in 1843
Bible colleges, seminaries and theological colleges in Scotland
Presbyterianism in Scotland
1843 establishments in Scotland
Education in Edinburgh
Religion in Edinburgh
Free Church of Scotland